
Henan is a province of China.

Henan may also refer to:
Henån, town in Sweden
2085 Henan, main-belt asteroid
Henan (footballer) (born 1987), Henan Faria da Silveira, Brazilian footballer

Places in China
Henan Mongol Autonomous County, a county in eastern Qinghai

Townships
Henan Township, Heilongjiang, in Keshan County, Heilongjiang
Henan Township, Sichuan, in Hanyuan County, Sichuan

Subdistricts
Henan Subdistrict, Gongzhuling, in Gongzhuling, Jilin
Henan Subdistrict, Hunchun, in Hunchun, Jilin
Henan Subdistrict, Jiaohe, in Jiaohe, Jilin
Henan Subdistrict, Panshi, in Panshi, Jilin
Henan Subdistrict, Yanji, in Yanji, Jilin

Former places
Henan Commandery, historical commandery centred on modern Luoyang
Henan Prefecture, historical prefecture centred on modern Luoyang
Luoyang, the seat of Henan Commandery (later Prefecture) and Henan County
Henan Jiangbei province, in the Yuan dynasty
Haizhu District, commonly referred to as "Henan District", referring to its location south of the Pearl River in Guangzhou, China

See also
Hunan